Oxhide, directed by Liu Jiayin, is a 2005 narrative independent Chinese film that portrays the director's family and their apartment in Beijing. Liu was 23 years old when the film was recorded.

Awards, nominations, and honors
 2005 Berlin International Film Festival
Caligari Film Award
FIPRESCI Award, Forum of New Cinema
 2005 Hong Kong International Film Festival
Golden DV Award
 2005 Vancouver International Film Festival
Dragons and Tigers Award

Sequel
In 2009, Liu Jiayin directed a sequel to Oxhide, entitled Oxhide II. Again taking her family as the film's subject, Liu takes a simple premise of a family making dumplings and uses it as the film's primary narrative device. The film premiered at the 2009 Cannes Film Festival as part of its Directors Fortnight program.

References

External links
 
 Oxhide at the Chinese Movie Database
 Oxhide on dGenerate Films website
 Review in Cinema Scope

2005 films
2005 drama films
Chinese drama films
Chinese docudrama films
Films set in Beijing
2000s Mandarin-language films